Synaphea platyphylla is a shrub endemic to Western Australia.

The shrub blooms between September and October producing yellow flowers.

It is found in the Wheatbelt and Goldfields-Esperance regions of Western Australia.

References

Eudicots of Western Australia
platyphylla
Endemic flora of Western Australia
Plants described in 1995